Lake Creek is an unincorporated community in Benton County, Missouri, United States.

Lake Creek takes its name from a stream which once had sloughs and small lakes located along it.

References

Unincorporated communities in Benton County, Missouri
Unincorporated communities in Missouri